Local elections were held in Malta on Saturday, 10 March 2012.

Elections were held to elect the local councils of Attard, Balzan, Birgu, Birżebbuġa, Dingli, Floriana, Gżira, Għargħur, Ħamrun, Iklin, Isla, Kirkop, Luqa, Marsa, Marsaxlokk, Mosta, Paola, Qormi, Safi, San Giljan, San Pawl Il-Bahar, Santa Lucija, Siġġiewi, Swieqi, Tas-Sliema, Żebbuġ (Malta), Żurrieq, Għajnsielem, Kercem, Munxar, Nadur, Qala, San Lawrenz, Xagħra and Żebbuġ (Gozo).

Results

References

20129
2012 elections in Europe
2012 in Malta
March 2012 events in Europe